The 2019–20 Coupe de France preliminary rounds, Grand Est was the qualifying competition to decide which teams from the leagues of the Grand Est region of France took part in the main competition from the seventh round.

A total of 19 teams qualified from the Grand Est preliminary rounds. In 2018–19, three teams made it as far as the round of 64. SC Schiltigheim lost to Dijon, US Raon-l'Étape lost to Iris Club de Croix and Olympique Strasbourg lost to Saint-Étienne.

Schedule
The first round of the qualifying competition took place during the 2018–19 season, during June 2019. It consisted of 698 clubs from the district leagues (tier 9 and below of the French league system) with some clubs from the Régional 3 division (tier 8) to shape the draw.

The second round took place in August, with most ties on the weekend of 18 August, and the remainder on the weekend of 25 August. 120 teams, mainly from tiers 7 (Régional 2) and 8 (Régional 3) with two from tier 6 (Régional 1), join at this stage. One team, ASTR Wittenheim, gained re-entry as a Lucky loser due to mergers and liquidations of clubs that have taken place between the first and second rounds.

The third round draw was made on 29 August 2019. The remaining 12 Régional 2, the remaining 36 Régional 1 teams and the 11 Championnat National 3 (tier 5) teams joined at this stage. One second round winner, Foyer Barsequanais, received a bye to the fourth round.

The fourth round draw was made on 18 September 2019. The five Championnat National 2 (tier 4) teams joined at this stage. 76 ties were drawn.

The fifth round draw was made on 2 October 2019. 38 ties were drawn.

The sixth round draw was made on 16 October 2019. 19 ties were drawn.

First round 
The first round was split into the separate competitions for the three sub-regions of Champagne-Ardenne, Lorraine and Alsace.

First round: Champagne-Ardenne 
These matches were played between 7 and 16 June 2019. Tiers shown reflect the 2018–19 season.

First round: Lorraine 
These matches were played between 8 and 30 June 2019. Tiers shown reflect the 2018–19 season.

First round: Alsace 
These matches were played between 30 May and 23 June 2019. Tiers shown reflect the 2018–19 season.

Second round
These matches were played between 15 and 27 August 2019.

Third round
These matches were played on 14 and 15 September 2019, with one yet to be arranged.

Fourth round
These matches were played on 29 September 2019.

Fifth round
These matches were played on 12 and 13 October 2019.

Sixth round
These matches were played on 26 and 27 October 2019.

References

Preliminary rounds